Max Fricke (born 29 March 1996) is an Australian speedway rider. He is a World team champion, twice Australian champion and four times Australian Under-21 Champion.

Career

Juniors
Fricke competed in junior levels of motocross and speedway in Australia, competed in the 2011 and 2012 FIM Youth Gold Cup tournaments, and finished in fourth place in the Australian Under-16 125cc Championship and second in the 125cc Team Championship in January 2012.

Seniors
Fricke moved up to senior level in the 2012/13 season. In December 2012 he was signed by Edinburgh Monarchs for their 2013 British Premier League team on a five-point assessed average, having spent the previous two summers in Britain gaining experience.

In January 2013 he won the Australian Under-21 championship at the Loxford Park Speedway in Kurri Kurri, beating Taylor Poole, Justin Sedgmen, and Alex Davies in the final, and becoming the youngest winner of the title since Leigh Adams in 1988. On 25 January 2014, Fricke won his second straight Australian Under-21 Championship at the Gillman Speedway in Adelaide. Fricke finished the heats with 13 points, 2 behind Nick Morris, before winning the final from Ryan Douglas and Jack Holder, the younger brother of 2012 World Champion Chris Holder, after Nick Morris had crashed on the last lap whilst in second place.

Together with Sam Masters, Max Fricke won the 2014 Premier League Best Pairs at Somerset.

After fishing equal third on 48 points with Justin Sedgmen in the four round 2015 Australian Championship (his best result to date), Fricke was classified fourth due to Sedgmen's better A and B Final results over the series (Fricke only qualified for the A Final in Rd.3 at Undera Park while Sedgmen qualified for the A Finals in Rd.1 at Gillman and Rd.2 at Olympic Park in Mildura).

A week after Australian Championship, Fricke then went on to win his third straight Australian U/21 Championship at Loxford Park on 17 January, defeating Jack Holder and Brady Kurtz in a closely fought final. He was presented his winners trophy by Chris Holder who himself won a record four Aussie U/21 titles (Holder jointly holds the record with Leigh Adams). With his third win, Fricke now sits equal second for total U/21 wins with Travis McGowan and former dual Under-21 World Champion Darcy Ward.

Fricke contested his first Under-21 World Championship in 2015, finishing the three round series held in Italy, Poland and the Czech Republic in a credible 6th place with 28 points scored.

Although he did not get to ride on the night, Fricke and fellow Aussie Justin Sedgemen were named as the reserve riders for the 2015 Speedway Grand Prix of Australia held on 24 October at the Etihad Stadium in Melbourne.

A week after the SGP in Melbourne, Fricke was part of the Australian Under-21 Team alongside Nick Morris, Jack Holder and Brady Kurtz that finished in third place in the 2015 Team Speedway Junior World Championship Final held at Olympic Park in Mildura, the first time the U/21 World Cup Final had been held outside of the UK or Europe. Fricke had a quiet night by his standards scoring only 6 of his team's 29 points as they finished behind winners Poland and runner-up Denmark.

On 13 December 2015, Fricke finished second in the 2015/16 South Australian Solo Championship at Gillman in Adelaide behind NSW rider Rohan Tungate with Sam Masters and Ty Proctor finishing in 3rd and 4th respectively. Fricke would go on to finish the championship in 3rd place having scored 52 points to finish behind winner Brady Kurtz and runner-up Sam Masters.

On 20 August 2016, Fricke, along with reigning Australian Champion Brady Kurtz, Jake Allen, Jack Holder and reserve rider Cameron Heeps finished in 2nd place in the 2016 Team Speedway Junior World Championship in Norrköping, Sweden.

On 2 October 2016, Max Fricke won the 2016 World Under-21 Championship becoming the 5th Australian rider to win the title following Steve Baker (1983), Leigh Adams (1992), Jason Crump (1995) and Darcy Ward (2009 and 2010).

Following a heavy crash by 2016 Speedway Grand Prix points leader Jason Doyle in the penultimate round of the series in Toruń, Poland which ruled the former Australian champion out of the final round in Melbourne (and also saw his World Championship aspirations vanish), Sam Masters was moved into the main field with Fricke moved from second to first reserve for the meeting. Following a broken chain to Wildcard rider Brady Kurtz just before the start of Heat 11 of the SGP in Melbourne, Fricke got his first start in the senior World Championship and became the 200th rider to race in the series since its inception in 1995.

On 28 January 2017, Fricke won his 4th Australian U/21 Championship at Loxford Park in Kurri Kurri. By winning the title, Fricke joined Leigh Adams and Chris Holder as a four-time winner of the event. He also equaled Leigh Adams' 5 podium finishes in the title with the same 4 wins and one 3rd-place finish record.

On 12 January 2019 he won the Australian Solo Championship, a second place in the fifth round enough to secure the title ahead of Rohan Tungate and Chris Holder. He won his first Grand Prix in 2020 at Toruń.

Fricke finished in 13th place during the 2022 Speedway World Championship, after securing 52 points during the 2022 Speedway Grand Prix, which included winning the Stadion Narodowy, Warsaw Grand Prix. He qualified for the 2023 Speedway Grand Prix by virtue of finishing 4th in the 2023 Speedway Grand Prix Qualification. However, the highlight of his season was winning the 2022 Speedway of Nations for Australia with Jack Holder. In addition he won a league title with the Belle Vue Aces during the SGB Premiership 2022.

He signed for Leicester Lions for the SGB Premiership 2023 and for GKM Grudziądz for the 2023 Polish speedway season.

Major results

World individual Championship
2016 Speedway Grand Prix - 35th
2017 Speedway Grand Prix - 18th
2019 Speedway Grand Prix - 16th 
2020 Speedway Grand Prix - 10th (including Toruń grand prix win)
2021 Speedway Grand Prix - 8th
2022 Speedway Grand Prix - 13th (including Warsaw grand prix win)

World team Championships
2017 Speedway World Cup - 5th
2018 Speedway of Nations - 4th
2019 Speedway of Nations 3rd
2020 Speedway of Nations - 5th
2021 Speedway of Nations - 4th
2022 Speedway of Nations - Winner

Individual Under-21 World Championship
 2015 -  /  /  - 6th - 28pts
 2016 -  /  /  - Winner - 46pts

Under-21 Speedway World Cup
 2015 -  Mildura, Olympic Park Speedway - 3rd - 29pts (6)
 2016 -  Norrköping, Vargarna Speedway - 2nd - 37pts (8)

References

Living people
Australian speedway riders
Belle Vue Aces riders
Edinburgh Monarchs riders
Leicester Lions riders
1996 births